Djiguible Traoré (born 12 March 1960) is a Malian boxer. He competed in the men's light heavyweight event at the 1984 Summer Olympics.

References

External links
 

1960 births
Living people
Malian male boxers
Olympic boxers of Mali
Boxers at the 1984 Summer Olympics
Place of birth missing (living people)
Light-heavyweight boxers
21st-century Malian people